Cyrtandra cleopatrae is a species of plant in the family Gesneriaceae endemic to the Philippines. It is a tropical shrub having recaulescent inflorescences composed of multiple purpled flowers that emerge on the plant stem from stubby shoots. It was first collected for science during a 1998 expedition sponsored by the Royal Botanic Garden Edinburgh, from a location in Palawan called Cleopatra's Needle (elev. 1550m), thus the specific epithet "cleopatrae". The taxon was first published in the Edinburgh Journal of Botany in 2001.

References

External links

Herbarium specimens: From JSTOR Plant Science
Map showing the location where living specimens of  C. cleopatrae were collected: From the Royal Botanic Garden Edinburgh Living Plant Collection (via dataset held at Global Biodiversity Information Facility, or GBIF.org)

cleopatrae
Endemic flora of the Philippines
Flora of Palawan
Plants described in 2001